Benjamin Thomas Slater (born 26 August 1991) is an English cricketer who plays for Nottinghamshire. Slater is a left-handed batsman who bowls right-arm off break. He was born at Chesterfield, Derbyshire.

Slater was educated at Netherthorpe School, before studying Sport and Business Management at Leeds Metropolitan University. While attending the university, he was selected to play for Leeds/Bradford MCCU, making his first-class debut in the team's inaugural first-class match against Surrey at The Oval in 2012. He made a second first-class appearance for the team in that same season against Yorkshire at Headingley. He was also a member of Derbyshire's squad for the 2012 season.

In April 2022, in the 2022 County Championship, Slater scored his maiden double century in first-class cricket, with an unbeaten 225 against Durham.

References

External links

1991 births
Living people
Cricketers from Chesterfield, Derbyshire
Alumni of Leeds Beckett University
English cricketers
Leeds/Bradford MCCU cricketers
Derbyshire cricketers
Nottinghamshire cricketers
Leicestershire cricketers